Time Trax is a science fiction television series that first aired in 1993.  A police officer, sent two centuries into the past to a parallel Universe, must apprehend and return convicted criminals who have escaped prison in the future. This was the last new production from Lorimar Television.

Production
Time Trax was created by veteran Hollywood producers Harve Bennett, Jeffrey M. Hayes and Grant Rosenberg. Rosenberg came up with the original idea, which Bennett and Hayes helped craft into the final premise.

It was one of the first three original programming of the Prime Time Entertainment Network, alongside Kung Fu: The Legend Continues and Babylon 5, and it ran between January 20, 1993, and December 3, 1994. Despite being well received by viewers, the network cancelled the series because they wanted to go in a different direction to increase their viewer base.

Despite its Washington, D.C., setting, the series was shot in Queensland, Australia, near the Warner/Roadshow Studios. It was the last series to premiere under the Lorimar Productions name.

Premise
In the year 2193, over a hundred criminals become fugitives of law enforcement by traveling back in time two hundred years to a parallel Universe, using a time machine called Trax. Darien Lambert is a police detective of that period who is sent back to 1993 in order to apprehend as many of the fugitives as possible. He is assisted by the Specified Encapsulated Limitless Memory Archive, or SELMA, an extremely small but very powerful computer (described as equivalent to a mainframe) disguised for the mission as a credit card; SELMA communicates through a holographic interface which takes the visual form of a woman. Lambert is also equipped with a Micro-Pellet Projection Tube disguised as a keyless car alarm remote, which can stun targets or engulf them in an energy field, rendering them transportable to the future. This process, executed by SELMA, incorporates a transmission sequence to send the criminal on his way. Dr. Mordecai Sahmbi, who was responsible for sending the fugitives to 1993, tries several times to kill Lambert.

Captain Lambert, fearing the possible consequences of altering the timeline, does not actively attempt to interfere with the natural flow of history, although he frequently leaves messages for his colleagues in 2193 (via the personals sections of assorted newspapers).

Cast

Regular
 Dale Midkiff as Captain Darien Lambert, Fugitive Retrieval Section. A police officer from the 22nd century. Born in 2160 and abandoned by his parents, he was raised in Enclave I-6 Middle City, the area formerly known as Chicago Land. As a child of his time, he has abilities superior to those of 20th-century humans: IQ 204, a speed memorization rate of 1.2 pages per second, a top speed of 8.6 seconds for 100 m, a heartbeat of 35 beats per minute and a life expectancy of 120 years, as well as mental focusing capabilities from beta wave training, including the ability to slow down the speed of visual images reaching the brain. He attended the International Police Academy at West Point, from which he graduated first in his class. In 2193, after over a hundred criminals escaped back to 1993, he is sent back to 1993 to retrieve them. 
 Elizabeth Alexander as SELMA (Specified Encapsulated Limitless Memory Archive), an advanced computer AI disguised as Darien's credit card. Selma communicates with both a voice and a holographic interface based on a picture of Darien's mother. Selma can place phone calls, perform medical and scientific testing as well as interface with virtually any computer including those belonging to law enforcement agencies, as well as having a vast amount of information in her database.

Recurring
 Peter Donat as Dr. Mordecai Sahmbi, a MIT professor and winner of the Nobel Prize for Physics for his theoretical work in the teletransportation of particle mass. Creator of the TRAX time machine. He was paid by criminals to send them to the past. In the first episode, he traveled to the past to escape Darien.
 Mia Sara as Annie Knox (Past - 20th century) and Elyssa Knox (Future - 22nd century)
 Elyssa Knox was a young prodigy, accepted to MIT at age 9. By age 17, she was Dr. Sahmbi's most gifted student. In episode 1, she became Darien's love interest. 
 Annie Knox: A Secret Service Agent whom Darien encounters after his arrival and in several other episodes.

Timeline
 2129 - The "Just War"
 2160 - Darien Lambert is born (August 17)
 2169 - Elyssa Knox is born (approximate)
 2178 - Darien is admitted to the International Police Academy at West Point (approximate)
 2178 - Dr. Mordicai Sahmbi of MIT wins Nobel Prize for Physics for his theoretical work in the teletransportation of particle mass (approximate)
 1993 - Darien Lambert arrives in the past (June 15)

Episode list

Season 1

Season 2

Home media
Time Trax was released on DVD on October 9, 2012, Warner Bros. released the complete first season on DVD in Region 1 via the Warner Archive Collection burn on demand service.  The second and final season was released the following year on July 9, 2013.

International broadcasters
 - Bangladesh Television
 - Doordarshan
 - ITV, Sci Fi Channel
 - PTV
 - MTV (Now known as Sirasa TV)
 - Sat.1
 - RTL Klub
 - Channel 2 (Telad)
 - CTC
 - RCTI
 - SBS
 - ICTV
 - Canal 13
 - SVT
 - TVNZ 2 (Originally known as Channel 2 and TV2)
 - Seven Network
 - Canal 2 (TCS)
 - Telefe
Perú - Canal 13 - Global Televisión

Video game 
 See main article: Time Trax (1994 video game)
A video game for the Super NES console based on the series was released on the U.S. market by Malibu Games in April 1994 (although some sources list December 1993). A Sega Genesis version was also developed and completed, and was reviewed in major gaming publications, but it was never released by the publisher. A prototype of the Mega Drive/Genesis version in fully finished state was leaked in 2013. The Genesis version's most notable difference is its soundtrack being composed by Tim Follin.

Notes

References

External links 
 
 

1993 American television series debuts
1994 American television series endings
1990s American science fiction television series
1990s American time travel television series
First-run syndicated television programs in the United States
Australian time travel television series
American time travel television series
Television series by Warner Bros. Television Studios
Prime Time Entertainment Network
English-language television shows
Television series set in 1993
Television series set in the 22nd century
Television series by Lorimar Television